Pronosnoye is a rural locality (a village) in Asovskoye Rural Settlement, Beryozovsky District, Perm Krai, Russia. The population was 319 as of 2010. There are 4 streets.

Geography 
Pronosnoye is located 27 km southeast of  Beryozovka (the district's administrative centre) by road. Vilisovo is the nearest rural locality.

References 

Rural localities in Beryozovsky District, Perm Krai